Queen Of Brush County is the debut album by King Creosote, released in 1998.

Track listing
Dr Alcohol       
Homeboy       
Philatelist       
Mantra-Rap       
Russian Sailor Shirts       
Piano Crushing Back       
Me In Here       
Flounder       
Your Guess Who's In At The Core?       
Fell The Way Down, Leslie       
Sparsety Sparse       
So Forlorn

References

1998 debut albums
King Creosote albums